Usman Yusupovich Yusupov (Uzbek: Usmon Yusupovich Yusupov; Russian: Усман Юсупович Юсупов; 1 March 1901 – 7 May 1966) was a Soviet Uzbek politician who was the de facto head of state of the Uzbek Soviet Socialist Republic from 1937 to 1950 as the First Secretary of the Communist Party of Uzbekistan.

Early life and education 
Yusupov was born in the village of Kaftarkhan in the Russian Empire on March 1, 1901. Born into a family of an Uzbek laborer, he too began working at a ginnery in Kovunch at the age of fifteen.

Political career 
Usman Yusupov joined the All-Union Communist Party (Bolsheviks) in 1926.

From 1926 to 1928, he served as the Chairman of the Tashkent District Committee of the Builders' Union. He then became the Head of the Organizational Department of the Tashkent District Committee of the Communist Party of Uzbekistan and served in the position from 1928 to 1929. From March 1929 to September 1931, he was the Secretary of the Central Committee of the Communist Party of Uzbekistan in the city of Samarkand. From September 1931 to December 1934, Yusupov served as the Chairman of the Central Asian Bureau of the All-Union Trade Union Confederation in Tashkent. From November 1936 to September 1937, Yusupov served as the People's Commissar of the Food Industry of the Uzbek SSR. He briefly served as the Chairman of the Supreme Soviet of the Uzbek SSR for five days.

Yusupov then served as the de facto head of state of the Uzbek SSR as the First Secretary of the Communist Party of Uzbekistan from 1937 to 1950. He also served as the First Secretary of the Tashkent Regional Committee of the Communist Party of the Uzbekistan from 1938 to 1943. He served as the Minister of Cotton Production of the Soviet Union from 1950 to 1953, and then served as the fourth Chairman of the Council of Ministers of the Uzbek SSR from 1953 to 1954. He worked as a director of state farm until 1959 when he retired.

Death 
Usman Yusupov passed away on May 7, 1966 in the city of Yangiyo'l. He was buried at the Chigatai Cemetery located in Tashkent.

Awards 

  Order of Lenin (six times)
  Order of the Patriotic War 1st Class
  Order of the Red Banner of Labour
  Order of the Badge of Honour

See also 

 Communist Party of Uzbekistan
 Uzbek Soviet Socialist Republic

References 

1901 births
1966 deaths
People from Fergana Oblast
Soviet politicians
Recipients of the Order of Lenin
First Secretaries of the Communist Party of Uzbekistan
First convocation members of the Supreme Soviet of the Soviet Union
Second convocation members of the Supreme Soviet of the Soviet Union
Third convocation members of the Supreme Soviet of the Soviet Union
Fourth convocation members of the Supreme Soviet of the Soviet Union
Central Committee of the Communist Party of the Soviet Union members
Heads of government of the Uzbek Soviet Socialist Republic
20th-century Uzbekistani politicians